Tyrosine-protein phosphatase non-receptor type 21 is an enzyme that in humans is encoded by the PTPN21 gene.

Function 

The protein encoded by this gene is a member of the protein tyrosine phosphatase (PTP) family. PTPs are known to be signaling molecules that regulate a variety of cellular processes including cell growth, differentiation, mitotic cycle, and oncogenic transformation. This PTP contains an N-terminal domain, similar to cytoskeletal- associated proteins including band 4.1, ezrin, merlin, and radixin. This PTP was shown to specially interact with BMX/ETK, a member of Tec tyrosine kinase family characterized by a multimodular structures including PH, SH3, and SH2 domains. The interaction of this PTP with BMX kinase was found to increase the activation of STAT3, but not STAT2 kinase. Studies of the similar gene in mice suggested the possible roles of this PTP in liver regeneration and spermatogenesis.

Interactions 

PTPN21 has been shown to interact with BMX and KIF1C.

References

Further reading